A proof of age inquisition was required during the feudal era in England to enable a minor to exit wardship. The age of majority to be proved for a male was 21, for a female 14 if married, 16 if unmarried. Witnesses were required to give evidence of the subject's date of birth, or christening. The findings of the inquisition were returned to the appropriate court, which then ordered the guardian to release the property to the ward, who obtained seizin. If the minor was a tenant-in-chief the inquisition reported to the appropriate Royal Court. The first stage of the process was the application by the ward for a writ for the inquisition to commence. This was effectively a written order by the king to the escheator in the county in which the ward's lands were situated, to empanel witnesses and begin the inquisition.

Example
The proof of age inquisition survives of Alan la Zouche, 1st Baron la Zouche of Ashby (born 9 October 1267 – died shortly before 25 March 1314), preserved in the Calendar of Inquisitions Post Mortem. Alan la Zouche was born in North Molton, Devon, on St Denis's Day (9 October) 1267 and was baptised in the church there, as was testified by his uncle "Henry la Zuche, clerk" and several local and other gentry and clerics at his proof of age inquisition in 1289 which enabled him to exit royal wardship:"Alan son and heir of Roger la Zusche alias la Zuch, la Souche. Writ to Peter Heym and Robert de Radington, to enquire whether the said Alan, who is in the king's wardship, is of full age, as he says, or not,  The eve of St. Margaret (20 June), 17 Edw. I. The said Alan, who was born at North Molton and baptized in the church there, was 21 on the day of St. Denis, 16 Edw. I. The Abbot of Lyleshull ( Lilleshall Abbey in Shropshire, to which he gave the advowson of North Molton Church in 1313) says the said Alan was born in Devon on the feast of St. Denis, and was 22 at that feast last past, and he knows it because he was keeper of a grange of Alan's father at Assheby four years ago, and knew from his father and mother that he was then 18. The prior of Repindon agrees, and knows it because his predecessor was created prior in the same year and was prior for twelve years, and he himself has now been prior for ten years. The prior of Swaveseye agrees, for he has been prior for twenty years, and saw him (Alan) before his creation when he was 2 years old. The prior of Ulvescroft agrees, for he has enquired from religious men, and especially from the nuns of Gracedieu who dwell near Alan's father's manor of Assheby. Brother William Ysnach of Gerendon agrees, for he sued the pleas of the house for nearly twenty-two (?) years, and Alan was born at the feast of St. Denis preceding. Geoffrey prior of Brackele agrees, for he was always with Alan's ancestors and ... twenty-four years ago, and within two years following Alan was born. Richard le Flemyng, knight, (probably of Bratton Fleming) agrees, and knows it from the wife of William de Raleye (probably of Raleigh, Pilton) who nursed Alan. John Punchardon, knight, (probably of Heanton Punchardon) agrees, for he held his land for such a time. Alfred de Suleny, knight, agrees, for his firstborn son was born on the same day. John de Curteny, knight, (i.e. Courtenay) agrees, for his mother died at Easter before Alan was born. William (?) de Sancto Albino, knight, agrees, for his brother gave him certain land, which he has held for twenty-one years, and one year previously Alan was born. William L'Estrange (Latinised as "Extraneus"), knight, agrees, for his (Alan's ?) father made him a knight sixteen years ago last Christmas, when Alan carried the sword before him, and was then 6 years old, except between Christmas and St. Denis. Robert de Crues, knight, agrees, for he has a daughter of the same age. Henry la Zuche, clerk, agrees, for he is his uncle, and likewise knows it from him who was at that time parson of the church of Hamme. Walter parson of Manecestre agrees, for the church of Karlingford in Ireland was given to him nearly twenty-two years ago, and when the news came to him in Devon Alan's mother lay in childbed. Robert parson of Pakinton agrees, for he was instituted into his vicarage at the Purification last past now twenty-two years ago, and Alan was born at the feast of St. Denis following.

See also
Court of Wards and Liveries

References

Feudalism in England
Minimum ages
English law